The Information Diet: A Case for Conscious Consumption is a 2012 book on media consumption by Clay Johnson.

Reception
Various commentators have reviewed the book. It has received generally good reviews.

References

External links

‘The Information Diet’: Should Americans Exercise More ‘Conscious Consumption’?, a discussion between the author and Hari Sreenivasan
One on One: Clay Johnson, Author of ‘The Information Diet’, a discussion between the author and Nick Bilton

 
2012 non-fiction books